RKSV Halsteren is a football club from Halsteren, Netherlands. RKSV Halsteren plays in the 2022–23 Sunday Vierde Divisie B.

History 
In January 2020, RKSV Halsteren was exploring a merger with RBC Roosendaal that was at the brink of a second bankruptcy. RBC had some assets that are of interest towards Halsteren's possible promotion to the Derde Klasse. After already agreeing on a new name and colors, the clubs decided not to merge.

References

External links
 Official site

Football clubs in the Netherlands
Football clubs in North Brabant
Association football clubs established in 1926
1926 establishments in the Netherlands
Sport in Bergen op Zoom